The 1863 United States Senate election in New York was held on February 3, 1863, by the New York State Legislature to elect a U.S. Senator (Class 1) to represent the State of New York in the United States Senate.

Background
Republican Preston King had been elected in February 1857 to this seat, and his term would expire on March 3, 1863.

At the State election in November 1861, 22 Republicans and 10 Democrats were elected for a two-year term (1862–1863) in the state senate. At the State election in November 1862, Democrat Horatio Seymour was elected governor; and a tied Assembly of 64 Republicans and Democrats each was elected for the session of 1863. In December, in the 15th Senate District, Republican William Clark was elected for the session of 1863 to fill the vacancy caused by the death of Democrat John Willard. The 86th New York State Legislature met from January 6 to April 25, 1863, at Albany, New York.

The election of a Speaker proved to be difficult in the stalemated Assembly. The Democrats voted for Gilbert Dean, the Republicans for Henry Sherwood, of Steuben Co. The Republicans, led by Chauncey M. Depew, became worried about the U.S. Senate election, due to occur on the first Tuesday in February. If the Assembly was not organized by then, the seat would become vacant, and could remain so until the next elected Assembly met in 1864. The Republicans, with a majority of 14 on joint ballot, were anxious to fill the seat, to have a maximum of support for President Abraham Lincoln in the U.S. Senate during the ongoing American Civil War. Theophilus C. Callicot, a Democratic assemblyman from Brooklyn, approached Depew to propose a deal: the Republicans should vote for Callicot as Speaker, and Callicot would help to elect the Republican candidate to the U.S. Senate. Depew put the proposition before the Republican caucus, and they accepted. On January 16, Sherwood and Dean withdrew. The Republicans then voted for Callicot, the Democrats for Eliphaz Trimmer, of Monroe Co. The Democrats, whose intention it was to prevent the election of a U.S. Senator, managed to postpone the vote for Speaker by filibustering for another ten days, but on January 26, Callicot was elected Speaker on the 92nd ballot (vote: Callicot 61, Trimmer 59, 3 Democrats were absent and 3 Republicans were paired). Thus the Assembly was organized to begin the session of 1863, three weeks late but in time for the U.S. Senate election.

Candidates
The caucus of Republican State legislators met on February 2, State Senator Alexander H. Bailey presided. They nominated Ex-Governor Edwin D. Morgan (in office 1859–1862) for the U.S. Senate. The incumbent senator Preston King was voted down.

The caucus of the Democratic State legislators met on the evening of February 2, State Senator John V. L. Pruyn presided. They did not nominate any candidate, instead adopting a resolution that "each Democratic member of the Legislature be requested to name for that office such person as he deems proper." They met again on the morning of February 3, and nominated Congressman Erastus Corning. The vote in an informal ballot stood: 28 for Corning, 21 for Fernando Wood, and 18 scattering. Wood's name was however withdrawn and Cornings nomination was made unanimous.

Election
In the Assembly, Edwin D. Morgan received the votes of the 64 Republicans, and Erastus Corning the votes of 62 Democrats. Bernard Hughes (Dem.), of New York City, voted for Ex-Mayor of New York Fernando Wood, and Speaker Callicot voted for John Adams Dix. Thus the vote was tied, and no choice made. Speaker Callicot, although elected by the Republicans, refused to vote for the Republican caucus nominee, insisting in his vote for Dix who had been U.S. Senator and U.S. Secretary of the Treasury as a Democrat, but was now a Union general in the Civil War. A second ballot was then taken, and the Republicans took Callicot's hint, and voted for Dix who was nominated by the Assembly. Thus Callicot kept his part of the bargain, knowing that, on joint ballot, the Republican state senate majority will outvote the Democrats, and elect their candidate. It was just necessary that the Assembly nominate somebody, so that it became possible to proceed to a joint ballot.

In the state senate, Edwin D. Morgan was nominated.

Both houses of the legislature then proceeded to a joint ballot.

Result
Edwin D. Morgan was declared elected after a joint ballot of the state legislature.

Aftermath
Morgan served one term, and remained in office until March 3, 1869.

See also 
 United States Senate elections, 1862 and 1863

Notes

Sources
The New York Civil List compiled by Franklin Benjamin Hough, Stephen C. Hutchins and Edgar Albert Werner, 1867 (see pg. 568 for U. S. Senators; pg. 443 for state senators 1863; pg. 496ff for Members of Assembly 1863)
Members of the 38th United States Congress
Result state election 1861 in The Tribune Almanac for 1862 compiled by Horace Greeley of the New York Tribune
Result state election 1862 in The Tribune Almanac for 1863 compiled by Horace Greeley of the New York Tribune
IMPORTANT FROM ALBANY.; Nomination of Ex-Governor Morgan for United States Senator by the Union Caucus. The Democrats Decline to Make a Nomination in NYT on February 3, 1863
PROCEEDINGS OF THE LEGISLATURE; SENATE; ...The Adjourned Democratic Caucus in NYT on February 4, 1863
IMPORTANT FROM ALBANY.; EX-Governor Morgan Elected U.S. Senator in NYT on February 4, 1863
Result in the Senate: Journal of the Senate (86th Session) (1863; pg. 95f)
Result in the Assembly: Journal of the Assembly (86th Session) (1863; pg. 151f and 154)

1863
New York
United States Senate